Zhanghua Town is a town and the county seat of Huarong in Hunan, China. The town was reformed through the amalgamation of Hucheng Township, Shengfeng Township and Chengguan Town on November 20, 2015. The town is located in the northern Huarong County, it is bordered by Shishou City of Hubei Province to the northeast, Sanfengsi Town and Zhihedu Town to the east, Xinhe Township to the south, Nianyuxu Town to the northwest, Wanyu Town to the northwest. Through the amalgamation of villages on May 26, the town has 14 villages and 18 communities, its seat is Huancheng Community.

History
Zhanghua Town was named after the ancient place of Clay Platform of Zhanghua located in Qingshui Village (modern Shilipu Village), northeast of the county seat. According to legend, the Clay Platform was palace ruins of King Ling of Chu (540–529 BC).

Administrative divisions

Amalgamation of villages in 2016

References

Huarong County
County seats in Hunan